Wynn Roberts may refer to:

Wynn Roberts (actor), (c. 1923/1924-2021) Australian actor
Wynn Roberts (biathlete) (born 1988), American biathlete